"Enough to Know" is a rock song performed by Australian band The Superjesus. The song was released in August 2001 as the third single from the band's second studio album, Jet Age (2000). The song peaked at number 42 on the Australian ARIA Singles Chart.

Track listing
CD Single (8573886502)
 "Enough to Know"	
 "Birdman"	
 "What You Don't Know"	
 "Just Enough Standing"

Charts

References

2001 singles
2000 songs
Songs written by Sarah McLeod (musician)
Song recordings produced by Ed Buller
Warner Records singles
The Superjesus songs